Mihkel Pung ( in Vana-Põltsamaa Parish (now Põltsamaa Parish), Kreis Fellin – 11 October 1941 in , Sverdlovsk Oblast) was an Estonian politician and a former Minister of Foreign Affairs of Estonia and Speaker of the National Council (upper chamber) from 21 April 1938 to 5 July 1940. Pung was Minister of Finance in 1931. He was arrested during the Soviet invasion of Estonia and sent to Sevurallag (Sosva lager), a Soviet gulag in Sverdlovsk Oblast. He died in imprisonment in 1941.

References

1876 births
1941 deaths
People from Põltsamaa Parish
People from Kreis Fellin
Landlords' Party politicians
National Centre Party (Estonia) politicians
Government ministers of Estonia
Finance ministers of Estonia
Ministers of Foreign Affairs of Estonia
Members of the Riigikogu, 1929–1932
Members of the Riigikogu, 1932–1934
Members of the Estonian National Assembly
Members of the Riiginõukogu
Chairmen of the Bank of Estonia
Recipients of the Order of the White Star, 1st Class
Estonian people who died in Soviet detention
People who died in the Gulag